Giulia Tofana (also spelled Toffana, Tophana) (died in Rome, 1651) was an Italian professional poisoner. She sold a poison called Aqua Tofana (supposedly invented by Thofania di Adamo, who may have been Giulia's mother) to women who wanted to murder their husbands.

Biography 

Information about Giulia Tofana's background is sparse. She was thought to have been born in Palermo. Speculation by historians that she may have taken the first name of her mother as her last name (a common practice at the time) led them to believe that she was the daughter of another Palermo poisoner, Thofania d'Adamo. Thofania d'Adamo was accused of poisoning with an arsenic concoction of her own invention, Aqua Tofana, and executed on 12 July 1633.

According to one version of events, Giulia Tofana fled to Rome and set up a poisoning ring that began to sell this poison to women who wanted to escape abusive or inconvenient spouses. There may have been 6 women in this poisoning ring active in the 1650s, including Girolama Spara, who took over after Giulia's death.

Tofana's involvement in all of this is not confirmed. The only recorded evidence of poisoning activities being the executions of Teofania di Adamo in 1633, and Girolama Spara in 1659 (claimed to be the daughter of Giulia Tofana).

Death 
Historians point to Giulia Tofana dying in her sleep in 1651 with no one aware of her poisoning activities.

Confusion of her activities with other poisoners active in the area have led to tales that she died in 1659, or 1709, or 1730 with further elaboration that she took sanctuary in a convent, and continued to manufacture and distribute poison for many years until she was found out, executed, and her body thrown over the wall of the church that had provided her with sanctuary.

See also 
 Catherine Deshayes Monvoisin
 Giovanna Bonanno
 List of serial killers by country
 My Last Duchess, a poem by Robert Browning

References

 Stuart, David C.  Dangerous Garden.  Frances Lincoln ltd, 2004.
 The most reliable source for the story of Toffana is Vita di Alessandro VII by Cardinal Pallavicini

1651 deaths
17th-century Italian criminals
17th-century Italian businesswomen
17th-century Italian businesspeople
Italian female serial killers
Poisoners
Year of birth unknown
Female organized crime figures
Businesspeople in manufacturing
Weapons trade